The International Chopin Piano Competition, often referred to as the Chopin Competition, is a piano competition held in Warsaw, Poland. It was initiated in 1927 and has been held every five years since 1955. It is one of the few competitions devoted entirely to the works of a single composer, in this case, Frédéric Chopin. The competition is currently organized by the Fryderyk Chopin Institute.

The Chopin Competition is one of the most prestigious competitions in classical music, often launching the careers of its winners overnight through major concert dates and lucrative recording contracts. Past winners have included Maurizio Pollini (1960), Martha Argerich (1965), Krystian Zimerman (1975), and Yundi Li (2000). The most recent winner has been Bruce Liu of Canada in 2021. Yundi Li is the most well known for being the youngest pianist, at the age of 18, to win the 2000 XIV International Chopin Piano Competition, and the youngest juror in history for the competition in 2015.

History 

The competition was initiated by Polish pianist and pedagogue Jerzy Żurawlew, who began seeking funds for a piano competition in 1925, influenced by Aleksander Michałowski. Żurawlew recalled later: "Young people at that time, not long after the end of the Great War, were taking a keen interest in sports. They were dyed-in-the-wool realists in their outlook on life. I would often hear that Chopin was excessively romantic, that he enervated the soul and weakened the psyche. Some went so far as to discourage the inclusion of Chopin as required repertoire in music schools. All that showed a fundamental lack of understanding, which I found very painful... As I watched young people’s enthusiasm for sporting achievement, I finally hit upon a solution: a competition! Here was a format to bring tangible advantages to young performers of Chopin in the form of monetary prizes and an international performing career."

Gathering funds for the competition proved to be a difficult task. As Żurawlew remembered in later years: "I met with utter incomprehension, indifference and even aversion. The opinion among musicians was unanimous: Chopin is so great that he can defend himself. At the Ministry, it was announced that there were no funds for it [...] and that the whole idea was unfeasible". In this difficult situation, help arrived from Henryk Rewkiewicz — a businessman, music lover and board member of The Warsaw Music Society, who offered his personal financial guarantees to cover the entire deficit expected to arise from the first Competition. 

Many years later Jerzy Żurawlew wrote, “[…] I was greatly helped by my friend Henryk Rewkiewicz, director of the Match Monopoly, who offered 15,000 złoty - a substantial sum at the time - for the Competition”. Ultimately, things picked up with the election of a new Polish president Ignacy Mościcki, who became the patron of the Chopin Competition.

Subsequent editions were organized in 1932 and 1937; the post-war fourth and fifth editions were held in 1949 and 1955. In 1957 the competition became one of the founding members of the World Federation of International Music Competitions in Geneva.

Traditionally, during the competition on 17 October – the day of Chopin's death – a solemn mass is celebrated in the Holy Cross Church in Warsaw, during which Wolfgang Amadeus Mozart's Requiem is performed in accordance with the wishes of the composer.

In 2018, the Chopin Institute organized the inaugural I International Chopin Competition on Period Instruments.

The XVIII International Chopin Piano Competition, originally scheduled for 2020, was postponed due to the COVID-19 pandemic and took place in 2021 instead.

Jury 

The jury has been chaired by:
Witold Maliszewski (1927)
 (1932 and 1937)
Zbigniew Drzewiecki (1949, 1955, 1960, 1965)
Kazimierz Sikorski (1970 and 1975)
Kazimierz Kord (1980)
Jan Ekier (1985, 1990, 1995)
Andrzej Jasiński (2000, 2005, 2010)
Katarzyna Popowa-Zydroń (2015, 2021)

Prize winners 

The laureates of the Chopin International Piano Competition:

Traditional special awards at the competition include the Polish Radio prize for the best mazurka performance (since 1927), the Fryderyk Chopin Society in Warsaw prize for the best polonaise (since 1960), and the National Philharmonic prize for the best performance of a piano concerto (since 1980).

Medal table 

Note: Medals were only awarded after 1975. In this table, winner of the 1st, 2nd and 3rd Prize prior to 1975 are included as having won Gold, Silver, and Bronze respectively.

In popular culture 
The Chopin Competition is a major plot device in the Japanese manga series Forest of Piano, serialized from 1998 to 2015 and adapted as an anime from 2018 to 2019. It follows the story of pianist Kai Ichinose, who ultimately wins the Chopin Competition. Creator Makoto Isshiki was inspired to write the series when she watched a documentary showing Stanislav Bunin winning the XI International Chopin Piano Competition. In 2023, a documentary film Pianoforte directed by Jakub Piątek shows the realities of the Chopin Piano Competition through exclusive behind-the-scenes footage and is set to premiere at the Sundance Film Festival.

See also 

 List of classical music competitions

References

Further reading

External links 

 
 History of the Competition in the Polish Culture Portal
 Official International Frederick Chopin Piano Competition for Amateurs website 
 Piano Competitions & Music Competitions at Bakitone International 
 Google Arts & Culture 

 
Music competitions in Poland
Events in Warsaw
Polish awards
Recurring events established in 1927
1927 establishments in Poland
Monuments and memorials to Frédéric Chopin